Ayaviri or Ayawiri (Aymara) is one of thirty-three districts of the province Yauyos in Peru.

See also 
 Llunk'uti
 Qutuni
 Wask'aqucha
 Wayna Qutuni

References